MyTV (or My TV) may refer to these television brands:

Africa
MYtv, a South African TV channel

Asia
Television Broadcasts Limited's online service in Hong Kong
My TV (Bangladeshi TV channel)
MYTV Broadcasting, a Malaysian broadcaster
myTV (Indonesia), a Mayapada-owned Indonesian network
myTV (mobile service), a defunct mobile TV service; see

Europe
My-Tv, an Italian internet television founded November 2000
MYTV International, a digital entertainment media company
MYtv Ukraine, a provider of satellite pay-TV services throughout Ukraine
MyTV (British and Irish TV channel), formerly known as My Channel

North America
MyTV (Arabic), an Arab-American provider of Arabic live channels and video on demand
MyNetworkTV, an American television network/syndication service
WWJE-DT (formerly WZMY, marketed as "MyTV"), a television station serving Boston, Massachusetts

See also

List of MyNetworkTV affiliates
Me TV (disambiguation)
MeTV
MYT (disambiguation)
MY (disambiguation)
TV (disambiguation)